Alinazik kebab, or simply Ali Nazik, is a home-style Turkish dish which is a specialty of the Gaziantep province of Turkey. It is made from smoked and spiced eggplant, grilled and then pureed, topped with cubes of sauteed lamb, previously seasoned and marinated. It is usually served with rice pilaf or yogurt with garlic, grilled vegetables, and melted butter.

See also
 Kebab
 List of kebabs
 List of lamb dishes
 List of smoked foods

References

Kebabs
Turkish cuisine
Middle Eastern grilled meats
Lamb dishes
Eggplant dishes
Smoked food